Jeffrey N. Vinik (born March 22, 1959) is an American investor and sports team owner. He worked at Fidelity Investments and managed a private hedge fund, and is the current owner of the Tampa Bay Lightning and a minority owner of the Boston Red Sox. He served on the board of directors for Liverpool Football Club of the Premier League from 2010–2013.

Early life
Vinik was born to a Jewish family in Deal, New Jersey. He graduated Phi Beta Kappa from Duke University in 1981 with a bachelor of science in civil engineering. He also obtained an MBA from Harvard Business School in 1985.

Career
Vinik managed the Fidelity Magellan Fund from 1992 to 1996, where he averaged 17% annual returns.  After leaving Fidelity, he started hedge fund Vinik Asset Management, with partners including Michael Gordon (now President of Fenway Sports Group).  He made investors 93.8% in his first 11 months and approximately 50% a year for the next three years. At the end of 2000, Vinik returned investors $4.2 billion and focused on managing his own portfolio. Vinik and his partners closed down the fund in December 2013, and distributed $9 billion in assets.

In 2010, he purchased the Tampa Bay Lightning from Oren Koules and Len Barrie for $170 million. In January 2011, he purchased the Tampa Bay Storm. The Storm folded in December 2017.

In 2020, The Lightning won the Stanley Cup Championship, defeating the Dallas Stars 4 games to 2. Vinik could not be in the NHL's bubbles in Edmonton or Toronto, so he called into his players' locker room celebration, "congratulating them for their second Stanley Cup championship in team history" after their win over the Stars, according to Pat Pickens of NHL.com. Vinik, who purchased the franchise in 2010, was in Florida watching the Lightning complete their 18-7 run through the Stanley Cup Playoffs and "had to tell his players how happy he was." He said on a video call, "Hey guys, awesome job. So many years in the making, with new guys and the guys who have been here for a while, unbelievable effort. Dominant through the playoffs. You deserve it". In Tampa, Alexis Muellner writes winning hockey has "been the goal since" Vinik bought the team in 2010. The Stanley Cup is "one of the hardest trophies to win in sports." The achievement has been "as much a goal for the organization as has its widespread efforts to transform the community". Sports Business Journal profiled Vinik in 2015 following the Lightning's second appearance in the Stanley Cup Final.

Philanthropy
In 1998, Vinik and his wife, Penny, donated $1.25 million to endow a professorship at Duke's engineering school. The next year, they donated $5 million towards facilities at the engineering school. In 2012, they donated $10 million to create a challenge fund to endow associate and full professorships dedicated to addressing complex societal challenges. He donated $1.5 million to build a new Jewish Community Center in South Tampa. With his wife, he also donated to Vanderbilt University in 2016-2017.

Awards and honors
Two-time Stanley Cup Champion (as owner of the Tampa Bay Lightning) - 2020, 2021

References 

1959 births
American financiers
American investment bankers
American money managers
Boston Red Sox owners
Businesspeople from New Jersey
Duke University Pratt School of Engineering alumni
Harvard Business School alumni
Living people
National Hockey League owners
People from Deal, New Jersey
Jewish American sportspeople
Tampa Bay Lightning executives
Arena Football League executives
21st-century American Jews